The VfL Herrenberg is a German association football club from the town of Herrenberg, Baden-Württemberg.

History 
The VfL Herrenberg was formed on 30 July 1848 as a gymnastics club. The football division of the club was established in 1919.

Squad

Honours 
The club's honours:

League
 Landesliga 3 Württemberg (VII)
 Champions: 1988
 Bezirksliga Böblingen-Calw (VIII)
 Champions: 1987, 2009, 2011

Recent seasons 
The recent season-by-season performance of the club:

*Season abandoned due to the COVID-19 pandemic.

References

External links 

 Official team site
 Das deutsche Fußball-Archiv historical German domestic league tables 

Football clubs in Germany
Football clubs in Baden-Württemberg
Association football clubs established in 1919
1919 establishments in Germany